The BMG Classic was a golf tournament on the Southern Africa based Sunshine Tour. It was founded in 2008 after title sponsors Bearing Man Group ended their long-standing relationship with the Highveld Classic.

Winners

References

Former Sunshine Tour events
Golf tournaments in South Africa